Sebastian Aguilera de Heredia (August 1561 – 16 December 1627) was a Spanish monk, musician and composer.

He was first the organist at the cathedral in Huesca from 1585 to 1603, and then moved to a more prestigious position as maestro de música at La Seo Cathedral in Saragossa. He published a collection of works in 1618, and eighteen of his keyboard works survive. He is considered the first major figure of the Aragonese School of music centered on Saragossa.

Organ music
1- Pange lingua a 3 sobre bajo por Ce-sol-faut;

2- Pange lingua a 3 sobre tiple;

3- Salve de Lleno de 1.er tono;

4- Salve de 1.er tono por De-la-sol-re;

5- Primera obra de 1.er tono;

6- Segunda obra del 1.er tono;

7- Primer registro de bajo del 1.er tono;

8- Segundo registro de bajo del 1.er tono;

9- Tercer registro de bajo del 1.er tono;

10- Primer tiento de falsas del 4º tono;

11- Segundo tiento de falsas del 4º tono;

12- Tiento grande del 4º tono;

13- Falsas del 6º tono;

14- Tiento del 8º tono por De-la-sol-re;

15- Obra de 8º tono por Ge-sol-re-ut;

16- Obra de 8º tono alto: Ensalada;

17- Dos bajos de 8º tono;

18- Discurso sobre los saeculorum;

19- [?] Tiento de Batalla de 8º Tono.

Vocal music
 Canticum Beatissimae Virginis Deiparae. Octo modis seu tonis compositium, quaternis vocibus, quinis, senis et octonis concinendum (Zaragoza, Tip. Pedro Cabarte, 1618).

Discography
 Hora, Joaquim Simões da (1994), Órgãos Históricos Portugueses: Évora & Porto, Lusitana Musica, Volume I, EMI Classics / Valentim de Carvalho. CD 777 7 547 55 2 4.
 Uriol, Jose Luis González (1990), Antología de obras para órgano: Sebastián Aguilera de Heredia, Ministerio de Educación y Ciencia: Centro de Publicaciones, 1032 CD.

Score editions
 Anglés, Higinio, (1965–68), Antología de Organistas Españoles del siglo XVII, Diputación Provincial de Barcelona: Biblioteca Central, Barcelona, 4 vols.
 Apel, Willi (1971), Spanish Organ Masters After Antonio de Cabezón, Corpus of Early Keyboard Music n.º 14, American Institute of Musicology.
Doderer, Gerhard (1981), Tientos de medio registro: Organa Hispanica, Heft V, Heidelberg, Willy Muller, pp. 5–9.
 Gay, Claude (1979), L'Ouvre d'Orgue, Paris, Editions Alphonse Leduc & C.ª, 2 vols.
 Kastner, Macário Santiago (1965), Silva Ibérica, Volume 2, Mainz, Schott, pp. 34–39.
 Pedrell, Felipe (1908), Antologia de Organistas Clásicos Españoles, Madrid, Ildefonso Alier, Volumen Primero, p. V e pp. 64–76.
 Perez, José Sierra (2001), Música para Órgano: Siglo XVII: Fr. Cristóbal de San Jerónimo; P. Pedro de Tafalla; P. Diego de Torrijos, Escorial, Ediciones Escurialenses, pp. 157–163.
 Rubio, Samuel (1971), Antologia de Organistas Clásicos, Madrid, Union Musical Española. [Reedition of 1914's edition from Pe. Luis Villalba Muñoz].
 Siemens Hernández, Lothar (1978), Obras para Organo, Madrid, Editorial Alpuerto.

Bibliography
ANGLÉS, Higinio: Antología de organistas españoles del siglo XVII, Barcelona, 1965–68, 4 vols.
APEL, Willi: Die spanische Orgelmusik vor Cabanilles, AnM, XVII, 1962.
APEL, Willi, Spanish Organ Masters After Antonio de Cabezón, Corpus of Early Keyboard Music n.º 14, American Institute of Musicology, 1971.
CABRAL, Luís (1982), “Catálogo do Fundo de Manuscritos Musicais”, Biblioteca Portucalensis, 2ª Série, n.º 1, Porto, Biblioteca Pública Municipal.
CALAHORRA MARTÍNEZ, Pedro: La música en Zaragoza en los siglos XVI y XVII, IFC, 1977-78.
CASARES, E., Francisco Asenjo Barbieri: Biografías y documentos sobre música y músicos españoles, Legado Barbieri, i (Madrid, 1986), 4–5.
DODERER,  Gerhard Tientos de medio registro, Organa Hispanica, Heft V, 1981, Heidelberg, Willy Muller, pp. 5–9.
DURÁN GUDIOL, Antonio: Órganos, organeros y organistas de la catedral de Huesca, Argensola, X, Huesca, 1959.
GAY, Claude, L'Ouvre d'Orgue, Paris, Editions Alphonse Leduc & C.ª, 2 vols, 1979.
HUDSON, Barton, A Portuguese Source of Seventeenth-Century Iberian Organ Music, Doutoramento, 1961, Indiana, Universidade do Indiana, Policopiado.
KASTNER, Macário Santiago "Três libros desconocidos com música orgânica en las Bibliotecas de Oporto y Braga", Anuário Musical, vol. I, 1946, Barcelona, pp. 143–151.
KASTNER, Macario Santiago: Contribución al estudio de la musica española y portuguesa, Lisboa, 1941.
KASTNER, Macário Santiago, Silva Ibérica, Volume 2, Edition Schott Music, 1965, pp. 34–39.
KASTNER, Macario Santiago: "Ursprung und Sinn des 'Medio registro'" AnM, XIX, 1964.
PALACIOS, José Ignacio, Los compositores aragoneses, Zaragoza, CAI, 2000. .
PEDRELL, Felipe Antologia de Organistas Clásicos Españoles, 1908, Madrid, Ildefonso Alier, Volumen Primero, p. V e pp. 64–76.
ROUBINET, M., «Sebastián Aguilera de Heredia», en: Gilles Cantagrel (dir.), Guide de la musique d’orgue, Éditions Fayard, 1991, .
RUBIO, Samuel Antologia de Organistas Clásicos, Madrid, Union Musical Española, 1971.
SIEMENS HERNÁNDEZ, Lothar: La Seo de Zaragoza, destacada escuela de órgano en el siglo XVII. I: Sebastián Aguilera y José Ximénez. AnM 21, (1966), 1968, pp. 147–167.
SIEMENS HERNÁNDEZ, Lothar, Obras para Organo, Editorial Alpuerto, Madrid, 1978.
Voz «Sebastián Aguilera de Heredia», Gran Enciclopedia Aragonesa.

Notes

References

External links

 Sebastián Aguilera de Heredia, at Cancioneros Musicales Españoles.

Roman Catholic monks
Renaissance composers
Spanish male classical composers
Spanish Baroque composers
Spanish classical organists
Male classical organists
Classical composers of church music
Cathedral organists
1561 births
1627 deaths
17th-century classical composers
17th-century male musicians